Two ships of the Japanese Navy have been named Hagi:

 , a  launched in 1920 she was renamed Patrol Boat No.33 in 1940 and lost in 1941.
 , a  launched in 1944 and scrapped in 1947.

Imperial Japanese Navy ship names
Japanese Navy ship names